Gangte is an ethnic group mainly living in the Indian state of Manipur. They belong to the Zo people and are parts of the Kuki or under Mizo tribe and are recognised a tribe of Manipur, India. They are also indigenous inhabitants of Mizoram, Assam and Myanmar, and a recognised tribe under the Indian Constitution. With a population of approximately 40,000 worldwide, they primarily live in Manipur's southern Churachandpur district and neighbouring states of Meghalaya, Mizoram and Assam.

Gangte also live in Chin State and Kabaw Valley of Myanmar.

Other clans or ethnic people in this group are the Thadou, Lushei, Paite, Vaiphei, Simte, Zou and any other Chin-Kuki-Mizo tribes.

Gangte is also the name of the language spoken by the Gangte people of northeast India and Burma, one of the northern Chin, Kuki and Mizo languages of the Tibeto-Burman family.

Notes and references

External links
 Ganggam.Org
 GanggamNews
 Ethnologue

Ethnic groups in Manipur
Scheduled Tribes of Manipur
Social groups of Assam
Kuki tribes
Scheduled Tribes of Assam
Scheduled Tribes of Meghalaya